Fruity Killer Tune is the third album from the J-pop group Melon Kinenbi. It contains only two of their more recent singles as well as one completely new track and a remix. In addition, fans were invited to vote on thirteen more songs that would appear on the album, making it an effective "Best of", containing many re-released singles and B-sides not previously released on an album. Fruity Killer Tune was released on December 6, 2006, more than two years after the group's second album.

Track listing 
 
 1st place in vote
 
 7th place in vote
 
 6th place in vote
 
 2nd place in vote
 
 8th place in vote
 
 11th place in vote
 
 12th place in vote
 
 5th place in vote
 
 3rd place in vote
 
 13th place in vote
 
 9th place in vote
 
 10th place in vote
  (Hard Flavor Remix)
 4th place in vote (from original version)
 Remixed to fit the album's theme
 Leather
New song

External links 
 Fruity Killer Tune entry on the Up-Front Works official website

2006 albums
Melon Kinenbi albums
Zetima albums